The Lake of the Woods Milling Company Limited was a milling company that operated a flour mill in Keewatin, Ontario for 79 years. At the height of its production, it was possibly the largest flour mill in the British Commonwealth.

The mill operated from 1887 to 1967.

History

Lake of the Woods Milling Company started May 21, 1887, to take advantage of a new railway and western grain production.

Formed by a team from the board of Canadian Pacific Railway (CPR), including George Stephen, 1st Baron Mount Stephen, William Cornelius Van Horne and James Ross, the headquarters were in Montreal, while the milling operations were based in Keewatin, Ontario. The location provided transportation via the CPR, access to raw product, and water-power from the Winnipeg River. 

The first mill was completed in 1888 with vice-president John Mather overseeing construction and funded by an initial corporate capitalization of $300,000.  Its peak production turned a daily 62,000 bushels of wheat into 10,000 barrels of flour. The flour was marketed under the name Five Roses, which became a world-famous brand. In 1913, Lake of the Woods released the first edition of the Five Roses Cook Book, which is still in production to this day. 

Most of the company's assets were purchased by a competitor, Ogilvie Flour Mills Company, in 1954. The mill closed in 1967.

See also
 Esterhazy Flour Mill - 1904 wood-frame construction flour mill in Saskatchewan
 Flour Mill
 Krause Milling Co. - 1929 grain elevator and flour mill site in Radway, Alberta.
 Ritchie Mill - oldest surviving flour mill in the province of Alberta.
 Watson's Mill -  is a historic gristmill in Manotick, Ontario, Canada.

References

Bibliography
 The Toronto World - Oct 9, 1920
  Manitoba Historical Society - The Lake of the Woods: Its History, Geology, Mining and Manufacturing
 Lake of the Woods Museum
 

Food and drink companies established in 1887
Food and drink companies disestablished in 1967
Manufacturing companies of Canada
Canadian companies established in 1887
Flour mills in Canada
Kenora
History of agriculture in Ontario
1887 establishments in Ontario
1967 disestablishments in Ontario
1954 mergers and acquisitions

Manufacturing companies based in Ontario